Serge Le Tendre (born 1 December 1946) is a French comics writer known from his collaborations with Régis Loisel, Pierre Makyo, Christian Rossi and TaDuc. He wrote a number of series together with Rodolphe.

Biography
Serge Le Tendre was born in 1946 in Vincennes, near Paris, in France. When he was 16, he started working as an assistant-accountant but two years later he started following the comics lessons at the university, delivered by artists and scholars like Jean-Claude Mézières, Jean Giraud, and Claude Moliterni. Fellow students included Régis Loisel and André Juillard.

Bibliography
The years given are for the album publications, not for magazine prepublications. All works in French unless otherwise noted.
Chinaman (1997-2007), 9 parts, with TaDuc (published in English by Europe Comics)
 (1993), 1 part, with Rodolphe and Antonio Parras
 (1987), 1 part, with Christian Rossi
 (1985-1989), 3 parts, with Christian Rossi
 (1996-2002), 2 parts, with Christian Rossi
 (2012-2015), 4 parts, with Jérôme Lereculey
White Claw (2013-2015), 3 parts, with TaDuc
 (2000-), 3 parts, with Servain
 (2015), 1 part, with Guillaume Sorel
 (1985), 2 parts with Pierre Makyo and Alain Dodier
 (1993-1995), 4 parts, with Dieter and Jean-Denis Pendanx
 (2004-2012), 5 parts, with Franck Biancarelli
Mission Vietnam (2003), 1 part, with Patrick Jusseaume and Jean-Charles Kraehn
Mister George (2003), 2 parts, with Rodolphe and Hugues Labiano
 (1992), 1 part, with Jean-Paul Dethorey
 (2011-2012), 2 parts, with Laurent Gnoni
 (1991-1994), 4 parts, with Pascale Rey (originally in Spanish)
The Bleiberg Project (2017-), 3 parts, with Frédéric Peynet
The Quest for the Time Bird (1983-2017), 9 parts, with Régis Loisel, Mohamed Aouamri and Vincent Mallié
 (1987-1997), 7 parts, with Rodolphe and Jean-Luc Serrano
 (1985), 1 part, with Fabien Lacaf
Terminus 1 (2016), 2 parts, with Jean-Michel Ponzio
 (2001), 2 parts, with Christian Rossi
 (2014-2015), 2 parts, with Frédéric Peynet
 (1987-1996), 5 parts, with Emiliano Simeoni and TaDuc

Awards
1986: won the Lucien award at the Angoulême festival for 
1986: Prix Yellow-Kid for best foreign artist
1999: Angoulême International Comics Festival Prix Jeunesse 9–12 ans for 
2002: nominated for the Angoulême International Comics Festival Prize for Best Album for 
2002: Prix Bob Morane for 
2004: nominated for the Angoulême International Comics Festival Prize Awarded by the Audience for

Notes

1946 births
Living people
French comics writers